Krogmann is a German surname. Notable people with the surname include:

Carl Vincent Krogmann (1889–1978), German banker, industrialist, and politician
Georg Krogmann (1886–1915), German footballer
Werner Krogmann (1901–1954), German sailor

See also
Krogman

German-language surnames